Prince George's Battery is an artillery battery in the British Overseas Territory of Gibraltar. The battery is located at Europa Flats just north of Eliott's Battery.

References

Batteries in Gibraltar